Masuriya Din Pasi (born 2 October 1911) was an Indian politician, a fighter for independence who served as a member of the Uttar Pradesh Legislative Assembly, the Constituent Assembly of India, the Provisional Parliament, and the first four Indian parliaments. 

Masuriya Din Pasi (मसूरिया दिन पासी) was born in Jondhval, Allahabad. He belonged to Pasi community, the second most numerous Scheduled Caste grouping in UP, second only behind the Jatav (जातव) community. He was educated at the Government Normal School in Allahabad. A businessman, he took part in the Indian independence movement, taking part against the criminal tribe act and was imprisoned several times between 1932 and 1944. He was a member of the Uttar Pradesh Legislative Assembly from 1946 to 1952, while also serving in the national Constituent Assembly and its successor, the Provisional Parliament. He was then elected to the first, second, third and 4th Lok Sabha, where he represented Phulpur and later Chail seats in Uttar Pradesh. He was a member of the Congress Party.

He was married to Laxmi Devi; they had 11 children.

References

1911 births
Year of death missing
India MPs 1952–1957
India MPs 1957–1962
India MPs 1962–1967
India MPs 1967–1970
Members of the Uttar Pradesh Legislative Assembly
People from Allahabad district
Lok Sabha members from Uttar Pradesh

Indian National Congress politicians from Uttar Pradesh